Xilin County is a county in the northwest of Guangxi, China, bordering Yunnan province to the south and west. It is the westernmost county-level division of the autonomous region and is under the administration of the prefecture-level city of Baise.

Climate

References

Counties of Guangxi
Counties and cities in Baise